First Base is the debut album by British rock band Babe Ruth. Produced by guitarist Alan Shacklock and Nick Mobbs, and engineered by Tony Clark at the EMI's Abbey Road Studios between June and September 1972, it was released that year.

The album track "Wells Fargo" — a hard rock song named after the cash-transporting stagecoach line of the American Old West, with lyrics evoking the era's cowboy legend — was released as a single and became an FM radio hit.

The album went gold in Canada, sold well in the US, but had disappointing sales by comparison in the UK.  The song "The Mexican" has been covered and remixed many times. Among them, it was covered in 1984 by John "Jellybean" Benitez with vocals by Janita Haan.  "The Mexican" was also mixed into the third track of The Dirtchamber Sessions Volume One by Liam Howlett of The Prodigy in 1999 and covered by GZA in 2015.

The sleeve design, painting and photography were by Roger Dean.

Track listing
 "Wells Fargo" (Alan Shacklock)  – 6:14
 "The Runaways" (music: Alan Shacklock, words: David Whiting)  – 7:12
 "King Kong" (Frank Zappa)  – 6:40, recorded in one take, no overdubs
 "Black Dog" (Jesse Winchester)  – 8:03
 "The Mexican" (Alan Shacklock)  – 5:48 - interpolates Per Qualche Dollaro in Piu (For a Few Dollars More, music by Ennio Morricone)
 "Joker" (Alan Shacklock)  – 7:42
 "Wells Fargo" (single version, CD only; Shacklock)  – 3:35
 "Theme from For a Few Dollars More" (CD only; Morricone)  – 2:19

Personnel
 Babe Ruth 
Janita "Jennie" Haan - vocals, castanets on The Mexican 
Alan Shacklock - acoustic and electric guitars, Hammond organ, percussion, vocals
Dave Hewitt - bass guitar
Dave Punshon - electric piano, keyboards
Dick Powell - drums, percussion

 Other musicians  
Gasper Lawal - conga, bongo, cabasa
Brent Carter - saxophone
Harry Mier - oboe
Peter Halling - cello - Leader 
Clive Anstee - cello
Manny Fox - cello
Boris Rickleman - cello
Jeff Allen - drums on "The Runaways"

Releases
1972: LP US/Canada, Harvest SW-11151
1972: LP UK, Harvest SHSP 4022
1972: LP Spain, EMI/Harvest 1J 062-05.159
1972: LP Italy, EMI/Harvest 3C 064-05159
1972: LP Japan, Odeon
1991: CD Canada, One Way 57343
1995: CD Germany, Repertoire REP 4554-WP
2001: CD Repertoire REP4554

References

External links
AllMusic review by François Couture; with links for session data
Amateur reviews

Babe Ruth (band) albums
1972 debut albums
Albums with cover art by Roger Dean (artist)
Harvest Records albums
Albums produced by Alan Shacklock